The 1995–96 Iowa State Cyclones men's basketball team represented Iowa State University during the 1995–96 NCAA Division I men's basketball season. The Cyclones were coached by Tim Floyd, who was in his 2nd season. They played their home games at Hilton Coliseum in Ames, Iowa.

They finished the season 24–9, 9–5 in Big Eight play to finish in 2nd place.  They defeated Nebraska, Missouri, and #5 Kansas to win the 1996 Big Eight conference tournament championship.  This was Iowa State's first conference championship in program history.  The conference championship earned them a bid to the NCAA tournament and a #5 seed.   In the tournament they defeated Cal and lost to Utah in the round of 32.

Following the 1995–96 academic school year, the Big Eight Conference was dissolved and the Big 12 Conference was formed. The former members of the Big Eight were joined by Baylor, Texas, Texas A&M, and Texas Tech, all formally of the Southwest Conference.

Games were televised by ESPN, CBS, Creative Sports (Big 8) and the Cyclone Television Network.

Previous season
The previous season the Cyclones finished the season 23–11, 6–8 in Big Eight play to finish in 5th place.  They defeated #17 Nebraska, #2 Kansas, and lost to # 19 Oklahoma State in the  1995 Big Eight conference tournament championship. They received an at-large bid to the NCAA tournament and a #7 seed. In the tournament they defeated Florida to reach the round of 32 where they lost to North Carolina who would advance to the Final Four.

Roster

Schedule and results

|-
!colspan=6 style=""|Exhibition

|-

|-
!colspan=6 style=""|Regular Season

|-

|-

|-

|-

|-

|-

|-

|-

|-

|-

|-

|-

|-

|-

|-

|-

|-

|-

|-

|-

|-

|-

|-

|-

|-

|-

|-

|-
!colspan=12 style=""|Big Eight tournament

|-

|-

|-
!colspan=12 style=""|NCAA Tournament

|-

|-

Awards and honors

All-Americans

Dedric Willoughby (HM)

All-Big Eight Selections

Dedric Willoughby (First Team)
Kenny Pratt (Second Team)

All-Big Eight tournament Team

Dedric Willoughby (MVP)
Kelvin Cato
Kenny Pratt

Big Eight Conference Newcomer of the Year

Dedric Willoughby

Big Eight Conference Coach of the Year

Tim Floyd

Ralph A. Olsen Award

Dedric Willoughby

References

Iowa State Cyclones men's basketball seasons
Iowa State
Iowa State
Iowa State Cyc
Iowa State Cyc